Krasino (Russian: Kpacинo) is a small Russian settlement in Arkhangelsk Oblast, on the southern island of Novaya Zemlya. It consists of a few buildings scattered across several miles and numerous tire tracks.

There is a lighthouse near the settlement, which is still in working order.

References

Novaya Zemlya
Populated places of Arctic Russia